William Nesbitt (22 November 1891 – 11 January 1972) was an English professional footballer who played as a winger. Nesbitt started his football career, aged 16, with his local side, Cornholme, before later joining Portsmouth Rovers. In 1911, he was signed by Burnley manager John Haworth, where he would make almost 200 first-team appearances. Nesbitt was first signed as an amateur, but Haworth gained permission for him to be released from his apprenticeship as a wood turner. With Burnley, Nesbitt won both the FA Cup (1914) and Football League First Division (1920–21). He moved to Bristol City in 1923 and had a short spell with Clapton Orient, but in 1924, he was forced to retire from the professional game through injury.

Nesbitt was acutely deaf his whole life. At Burnley, his teammates communicated with him using a variety of methods, including shirt-pulling, hand signalling and lip-reading. When his football career ended, he opened a tobacconist and sweet shop in Paddington, Central London. He returned to Todmorden, and in 1972, he died in hospital in Halifax.

References

Specific

General

1891 births
1972 deaths
People from Todmorden
English footballers
Association football midfielders
Burnley F.C. players
Bristol City F.C. players
Leyton Orient F.C. players
English Football League players
Burnley F.C. wartime guest players
Footballers from Yorkshire
FA Cup Final players